"Vilcabamba" is a 2010 science fiction short story by Harry Turtledove, notable both for its content and for the writer's unusual decision to publish it free online on tor.com and thus waive the royalties from its publication (see external link below). The story would later be reprinted in Turtledove's short-story collection The Best of Harry Turtledove in 2021.

Etymology
The title of the story is taken from Vilcabamba, Peru, the capital of the Neo-Inca State and the last outpost maintained by the Incas before it was completely crushed by Spain in the sixteenth century. In the story, one of Moffatt's cabinet shares this story with Moffatt, who is resigned to the fact that his rump U.S. will play that same role.

Turtledove analogizes the events of his story to the Spanish colonization of South America in several ways:
 The Krolp are initially greeted with peaceful overtures by humanity, which they quickly and violently refuse.
 The Krolp possess technology far beyond human understanding despite decades of attempts to reverse-engineer it.
 The Krolp view humans as sub-creatures, and do their best to "Krolpize" those humans within their control.
 The Krolp value mineral wealth, and readily violate a treaty they had made with the U.S. to get to it.

Plot
It is the 22nd century, and 50 years have passed after an alien race called the Krolp conquered and occupied much of planet Earth. The President of the United States and Prime Minister of Canada, Harris Moffatt III, rules a rump United States and Canada (whose governments merged in order to pool resources against the Krolp) that runs along the Rocky Mountains and the Wasatch Range with its de facto capital at Grand Junction, Colorado. Washington, D.C. remains the de jure capital of the United States, although it is under Krolp occupation and the last president to have actually resided in the city was Moffatt's grandfather Harris Moffatt I.

After being left alone for decades following the signing of a treaty between the Krolp and the remains of U.S./Canada, the Krolp demand access to silver and a small amount of gold deposits miles deep below the surface of northeastern Utah. Moffat, realizing that any Krolp mining operation will leave the remainder of the U.S. and Canada uninhabitable (Spain had been left practically uninhabitable after the Krolp had strip-mined nearly the whole country for the mercury they discovered deep below its surface) refuses, and launches an uprising. The uprising initially surprises the Krolp but within three days it is swiftly and completely crushed. The last remnants of the U.S. and Canadian military are defeated and Moffatt and his wife attempt to flee to northward. However they are captured and forced to live out the rest of their lives in exile in the Krolp's North American capital of St. Louis, Missouri.

References

External links
 Online text of "Vilcabamba"

Short stories by Harry Turtledove
Science fiction short stories
2010 short stories
Works originally published in online magazines
Colonialism in popular culture
Alien invasions in fiction
Short stories set in the United States
Fiction set in the 22nd century
Works set in the 22nd century